Ailill Ollamh (or Oilill Olum) in Irish traditional history was the son of Mug Nuadat and was a king of the southern half of Ireland, placed in the 3rd century by early modern Irish genealogy. Sadb ingen Chuinn, daughter of Conn of the Hundred Battles, in her second marriage, married Ailill. He divided the kingdom between his sons Éogan Mór, Cormac Cas, and Cían. Éogan founded the dynasty of the Eóganachta. Sadb's son Lugaid Mac Con, who was Ailill's foster-son, became High King of Ireland.

The Book of Leinster contains poems ascribed to him.

The O'Sullivans are one of the number of surnames listed below as descendants of Ailill Ollamh. An Leabhar Muimhneach (The Book of Munster) has an extensive genealogy of the Eóganacht septs.

Legend
Ailill, King of Munster, discovered that the grass in his fields would not grow. Without the grass, there were no herds; without the cattle, his people would starve. Ferchess the Druid told him to go to Knockainey at Samhain Eve. When he arrived, Ailill became drowsy and fell into a half-sleep in which he had a vision of Áine, the goddess of plentiful crops and fertility.  Overcome with desire, he forced himself upon her, an assault ending in Áine biting off his ear, hence the name Aulom "one-eared". By Ancient Irish law, only an "unblemished" person can rule, and by maiming him so, Áine rendered him unfit to be king. As an embodiment of sovereignty, she can both grant and remove a man's power to rule.

Closer to history
In one of the oldest surviving tracts on the early history of the Deirgtine, the Proto-Eóganachta, Ailill is himself called a druid. Furthermore, whether or not his father Mug Nuadat ever existed beyond some family association with the god Nuada, Ailill is usually believed a relation or probable descendant of Nia Segamain.

See also

 Gailenga
 Luighne Connacht

References

External links
Eoghanacht Genealogies 
Eberian Kings

Legendary Irish kings
Cycles of the Kings
Áine
Irish poets